Polzin is a surname. Notable people with the surname include: 

Alexander Polzin (born 1973), German artist and costume and set designer
Daniela Polzin (born 1979), Brazilian judoka
Jacob Ephraim Polzin (1778–1851), German architect
Robert Polzin, American biblical scholar